Yulia Yurievna Belokobylskaya (born 14 December 1995) is a Russian former artistic gymnast. She is the 2011 Russian champion and European bronze medalist on the floor exercise. She also won a silver medal with the Russian team at the 2011 World Championships.

Career

Junior 
At the International Gymnix in Montreal in March 2009, Belokobylskaya won a bronze medal with the Russian team. She also won a bronze medal on the floor exercise, and she finished seventh on the vault and eighth in the all-around.

Senior

2011 
In February, Belokobylskaya competed at the Russian Championships. She won gold on the floor exercise and bronze on the balance beam, and she finished fifth in the all-around. She then competed at the Cottbus Challenger Cup, where she finished seventh on the uneven bars. At the City of Jesolo Trophy later in March, she won bronze with the Russian team and finished seventh in the all-around with a score of 54.650.

Belokobylskaya competed at the European Championships where she won a bronze medal on the floor exercise with a score of 14.450 (just 0.050 behind the gold medal winner, Sandra Izbaşa). At the Russian Cup, she won the bronze medal in the all-around behind Anna Dementyeva and Viktoria Komova. In the event finals, she won the bronze medals on the uneven bars, balance beam, and floor exercise.

Belokobylskaya competed at the World Championships alongside Ksenia Afanasyeva, Viktoria Komova, Anna Dementyeva,  Tatiana Nabieva, and Yulia Inshina. In the team finals, she competed on the floor exercise and scored a 14.633 to help the team win the silver medal behind the United States.

2012–2013 
At the 2012 Russian Championships, she finished ninth in the all-around. In the event finals, she finished fifth on the uneven bars and fourth on the balance beam, and she won the bronze medal on the floor exercise behind Anastasia Grishina and Ksenia Afanasyeva. Then at the 2012 Russian Cup, she placed seventh in the all-around. She was not selected for the Olympic team. In November 2012, she competed at the Swiss Cup with Igor Pakhomenko, and they finished seventh in the team competition.

Belokobylskaya retired from gymnastics in 2013.

Competitive history

References

External links
 

Russian female artistic gymnasts
1995 births
Living people
Medalists at the World Artistic Gymnastics Championships
Sportspeople from Rostov-on-Don